Gottelborn Solar Park is an 8.4-MWp photovoltaic power station located in Göttelborn, in Quierschied municipality, Germany. The power plant was constructed by City Solar in two stages. The first stage was completed in August, 2004, followed by the second stage three years later in November 2007.

The first stage of the plant includes 23,500 solar modules from the French manufacturer "Photowatt" at an estimated efficiency of 14%, with a nominal power output of 4 MWp and occupies a total area of  The construction of the second stage required another 50,000 PV modules.

See also 

Photovoltaic power stations
Solar power in Germany

References

External links 
Power plant photos

Photovoltaic power stations in Germany
Economy of Saarland
Saarbrücken (district)